Gabriel Sandu (7 November 1952 – 1 October 1998) was a Romanian football defender.

Club career
Gabriel Sandu was born in Bucharest on 7 November 1952 and started playing football at Metalul București. Afterwards, he went to play for Dinamo București, where he spent a total of 9 seasons, making his Divizia A debut on 2 May 1971 in a 1–0 victory against Argeș Pitești, winning the title in his first season spent at the club, in which he made 9 appearances. He won three more titles with The Red Dogs in the first he appeared in 28 matches without scoring, in the second he played 25 games and scored 2 goals and in the third he made 29 appearances and scored one goal. After playing 192 Divizia A games in which he scored 4 goals for Dinamo and made 14 appearances in European competitions, Sandu went to play for Progresul București, where he ended his career after making 19 appearances in the league, his last Divizia A match taking place on 30 October 1981 in a 1–0 victory against Politehnica Timișoara. Gabriel Sandu died on 1 October 1998, at the age of 45.

International career
Gabriel Sandu played 17 games at international level for Romania, making his debut on 5 June 1974 under coach Valentin Stănescu in a friendly which ended 0–0 against Netherlands. He played five matches at the Euro 1976 qualifiers and made two appearances at the 1973–76 Balkan Cup. Sandu scored one goal in a friendly against Iran which ended 2–2 and made his last appearance for the national team on 22 September 1976 in a friendly which ended 1–1 against Czechoslovakia. Sandu also appeared for Romania's Olympic team in five qualification matches for the 1976 Summer Olympics, scoring one goal in a 4–0 victory against Denmark.

International goals
Scores and results list Romania's goal tally first, score column indicates score after each Sandu goal.

Honours
Dinamo București
Divizia A: 1970–71, 1972–73, 1974–75, 1976–77
Cupa României runner-up: 1970–71

Notes

References

External links
Gabriel Sandu at Labtof.ro

1952 births
1998 deaths
Romanian footballers
Romania under-21 international footballers
Romania international footballers
Association football defenders
Liga I players
Liga II players
Faur București players
FC Dinamo București players
FC Progresul București players
Footballers from Bucharest